{{DISPLAYTITLE:Nucleoside oxidase (H2O2-forming)}}

Nucleoside oxidase (H2O2-forming) is an enzyme with systematic name nucleoside:oxygen 5'-oxidoreductase (H2O2-forming). This enzyme catalyses the following chemical reaction

 adenosine + 2 O2 + H2O  9-riburonosyladenine + 2 H2O2 (overall reaction)
(1a) adenosine + O2  5'-dehydroadenosine + H2O2
(1b) 5'-dehydroadenosine + O2 + H2O  9-riburonosyladenine + H2O2

This enzyme contains Heme and belongs to a flavoprotein family.

References

External links 
 

EC 1.1.3